Ahmet Uyar is a Turkish Greco-Roman wrestler competing in the 63 kg division. He is a member of İstanbul Büyükşehir Belediyesi S.K.

Career 
Ahmet Uyar won the silver medal in the 63 kg event at the 2021 U23 World Wrestling Championships held in Belgrade, Serbia.

In 2022, he won one of the bronze medals in his event at the Vehbi Emre & Hamit Kaplan Tournament held in Istanbul, Turkey. He won one of the bronze medals in the men's 63 kg event at the 2022 European Wrestling Championships held in Budapest, Hungary.

Major results

References

External links 
 

1998 births
Living people
Turkish male sport wrestlers
European Wrestling Championships medalists
20th-century Turkish people
21st-century Turkish people